Matthias Hobein (born 11 February 1981) is a German lightweight rower. He won a gold medal at the 2003 World Rowing Championships in Milan with the lightweight men's eight.

References

1981 births
Living people
German male rowers
World Rowing Championships medalists for Germany